Darijo Biščan (born 26 August 1985) is a Slovenian football striker who plays for SAK Klagenfurt in the Austrian fourth tier-Kärntner Liga.

References

External links
Player profile at PrvaLiga 
regionalliga.at profile(german)

1985 births
Living people
Association football forwards
Slovenian footballers
NK Ivančna Gorica players
NK Celje players
FC Koper players
Slovenian PrvaLiga players
Slovenian Second League players
Kategoria Superiore players
Austrian Regionalliga players
Austrian Landesliga players
Slovenian expatriate footballers
Expatriate footballers in Austria
Slovenian expatriate sportspeople in Austria